Zulfadli bin Zulkiffli (born 11 February 1993) is a former Malaysian badminton player. He was the boys' singles gold medalists at the 2011 Asian and World Junior Championships, also at the Commonwealth Youth Games.

In 2018, Zulkiffli was found guilty by the Badminton World Federation and barred from all badminton-related activities for 20 years over match fixing violations.

Achievements

World Junior Championships 
Boys' singles

Asian Junior Championships 
Boys' singles

Commonwealth Youth Games 
Boys' singles

BWF Grand Prix 
The BWF Grand Prix has two levels, the BWF Grand Prix and Grand Prix Gold. It is a series of badminton tournaments sanctioned by the Badminton World Federation (BWF) since 2007.

Men's singles

  BWF Grand Prix Gold tournament
  BWF Grand Prix tournament

BWF International Challenge/Series 
Men's singles

  BWF International Challenge tournament
  BWF International Series tournament

References

External links 
 

1993 births
Living people
Sportspeople from Los Angeles
American emigrants to Malaysia
Citizens of Malaysia through descent
Malaysian people of Malay descent
Malaysian people of Indonesian descent
People from Petaling Jaya
Malaysian male badminton players
Universiade bronze medalists for Malaysia
Universiade medalists in badminton
Medalists at the 2015 Summer Universiade
Medalists at the 2017 Summer Universiade
Malaysian Muslims